Zook can refer to the following:

People
 Chris Zook, business writer
 John Zook (born 1947), National Football League player
 Frederic Zook, President of Ottawa University and former mayor of Ottawa, Kansas
 George F. Zook (1885-1951), American educator
 Matthew Zook, geographer
 R. Harold Zook (1889-1949), American architect
 Ron Zook (born 1954), American football coach
 Samuel K. Zook (1821-63), Union army general killed at Gettysburg

Places
 Zook, Kansas, Pawnee County, Kansas
 14267 Zook, an asteroid

Entertainment
 Zook (band), a Finnish rock band
 Zook (character), a DC Comics alien associated with the Martian Manhunter
 a creature designed by a contestant on the BBC game show Bamzooki
 Zook, someone who eats their bread butter side down in Dr. Seuss's The Butter Battle Book
 Zooks, enemies in the platform video game The Kore Gang

See also
 Zook House (disambiguation)